WFKL (93.3 MHz) is an FM radio station licensed to Fairport, New York, and serving the Rochester metropolitan area. The station, branded as "Fickle 93.3", broadcasts an adult hits radio format, or what the station refers to as "We Play Everything," similar to Jack FM. It is and owned by Stephens Media Group which also owns WRMM and WZNE.  The studios are in the First Federal Plaza building in downtown Rochester.

WFKL has an effective radiated power (ERP) of 4,400 watts.  The transmitter is off Five Mile Line Road in Penfield, New York.

History
The station got its construction permit from the Federal Communications Commission in 1990.  Before it was on the air, it was given the call sign WXME and was licensed to Avon, New York.  The first owner was Karen S. Klehamer.  In 1993, it signed on the air as WEZO, playing an easy listening format.  At that time it was owned by The Lincoln Group L.P.

In May 1995, WEZO switched to classic rock as WHRR "The River".

Before changing to variety hits in April 2005, the station carried an oldies format as "Oldies 93.3" and later "93BBF".

The station was previously owned by Entercom Communications (now Audacy, Inc.)

References

External links

FKL
Radio stations established in 1993
1993 establishments in New York (state)
Adult hits radio stations in the United States